Royapuram is a legislative assembly constituency, that includes the locality, Royapuram. Its State Assembly Constituency number is 17. Royapuram assembly constituency is a part of Chennai North Parliamentary constituency. It is one of the 234 State Legislative Assembly Constituencies in Tamil Nadu, in India.

Tamil Nadu

Election results

2021

2016

2011

2006

2001

1996

1991

1989

 Due to the split after MGR's death, R. Somasundaram, was part of ADK (Janaki), and not part of the other splinter group ADK (Jayalalitha).

1984

K. Rajan belonged to the Gandhi Kamaraj National Congress.

1980

1977

References 
 

Assembly constituencies of Tamil Nadu
Politics of Chennai